Thomas Carey (1597 - 1634) was a courtier to Charles I and English Member of Parliament.

Life
He was born 16 September 1597, the second son of Robert Carey, 1st Earl of Monmouth. He was tutored within his father's household by Henry Burton.  He became groom of the bedchamber to Charles, then Prince of Wales, in 1616 and retained that post until his death. In 1617 he was sent with Sir John Digby to Madrid and subsequently traveled in France and Germany. When Giles Mompesson was expelled from his parliamentary seat of Great Bedwyn in 1621, he was returned at the subsequent by-election as the Court candidate despite his lack of local connections. In 1623 he was sent to Madrid in the wake of Prince Charles and Buckingham. 

Between 1624 and 1929 Carey was elected for Cornish constituencies through the influence of his mother's links to the local gentry. He represented Helston (1624–25), Tregony (1625–26) and St Mawes (1628–29). He was granted Sunninghill Park in Berkshire by the king in 1630. Carey was preparing to go on embassy to Venice, when his health failed and he died in 1634. He was buried in Westminster Abbey.

Family
Carey married, Margaret, daughter of the Master of Requests, Thomas Smith of Abingdon, Berkshire (now Oxfordshire) & Parson's Green, Middlesex and his wife, Frances, later Countess of Exeter. They had three daughters:

Philadelphia married Sir Henry Lyttelton, 2nd Baronet.
Frances
Elizabeth married John Mordaunt, 1st Viscount Mordaunt.

After Carey died, Margaret married Sir Edward Herbert.

Notes

1634 deaths
Year of birth missing
Members of the pre-1707 English Parliament for constituencies in Cornwall
People from Sunninghill
Thomas
English MPs 1624–1625
English MPs 1625
English MPs 1626
English MPs 1628–1629
Younger sons of earls